San Pedro Teozacoalco is a town and municipality in Oaxaca, in south-western Mexico. It is part of the Nochixtlán District in the southeast of the Mixteca Region.

As of 2005, the municipality had a total population of 1,298, of which only 13 spoke a native language other than Spanish.

References

Municipalities of Oaxaca